George Tudoran is a Romanian professional footballer who plays as a centre midfielder.

Club career
Tudoran made his professional debut playing for Rapid București on 29 August 2015 in a match against CS Balotești. He scored a goal in his debut.

Honours
Rapid București
Liga II: 2015–16

References

External links

Sportspeople from Târgu Jiu
Living people
1996 births
Romanian footballers
Association football midfielders
Liga II players
FC Viitorul Constanța players
FC Rapid București players
FC Olimpia Satu Mare players
CS Pandurii Târgu Jiu players
FC Dunărea Călărași players
FC Metaloglobus București players
ACS Viitorul Târgu Jiu players
SSU Politehnica Timișoara players
Cypriot First Division players
Romanian expatriate footballers
Expatriate footballers in Cyprus
Romanian expatriate sportspeople in Cyprus